Marx's worm snake (Ramphotyphlops marxi) is a species of snake in the family Typhlopidae. The species is endemic to the Philippines.

Etymology
The specific name, marxi, is in honor of American herpetologist Hymen Marx.

Geographic range
R. marxi is known only from Samar island in the central Philippines.

Reproduction
R. marxi is oviparous.

References

Further reading
Wallach V (1993). "A New Species of Blind Snake, Typhlops marxi, from the Philippines (Serpentes: Typhlopidae)". Raffles Bull. Zool. 41 (2): 263–278.

Ramphotyphlops
Reptiles described in 1993